Willi Moser (17 March 1894 – 18 November 1963) was a Swiss hurdler. He competed in the 110 metres hurdles at the 1920 Summer Olympics and the 1924 Summer Olympics.

References

1894 births
1963 deaths
Athletes (track and field) at the 1920 Summer Olympics
Athletes (track and field) at the 1924 Summer Olympics
Swiss male hurdlers
Swiss male javelin throwers
Olympic athletes of Switzerland
Place of birth missing